The Doi Suthep bent-toed gecko (Cyrtodactylus doisuthep) is a species of gecko that is endemic to northern Thailand.

References 

Cyrtodactylus
Reptiles described in 2014